The 1989–90 Allsvenskan was the 56th season of the top division of Swedish handball. 12 teams competed in the league. Redbergslids IK won the regular season but HK Drott won the playoffs and claimed their sixth Swedish title. Vikingarnas IF, Katrineholms AIK and HK Cliff were relegated.

League table

Playoffs

Semifinals
 IF Saab–Redbergslids IK 29–26, 22–18 (IF Saab won series 2–0)
 HK Drott–Irsta HF 27–23, 24–23 (HK Drott won series 2–0)

Finals
 HK Drott–IF Saab 20–25, 22–16, 20–15, 25–16 (HK Drott won series 3-1)

References 

Swedish handball competitions